Nong Rong (born September 1967) is a Chinese politician and diplomat of Zhuang ethnicity, currently serving as Assistant Minister of Foreign Affairs, previously he was Chinese Ambassador to Pakistan.

He was a delegate to the 13th National People's Congress.

Biography
Nong was born in Mashan County, Guangxi, in September 1967. 

He joined the Chinese Communist Party in January 1987, and began his political career in July 1991. After graduating from Peking University in 1991, he was assigned to the Guangxi Foreign Economic and Trade Commission, becoming director of the Cooperation Division in April 2002 and dean and director in January 2003. After working in the Department of Commerce of Guangxi Autonomous Region for a year, he was transferred to the Guangxi International Expo Affairs Bureau. In April 2013, he was vice-mayor and deputy party chief of Fangchenggang, he remained in that position until December 2015, when he was transferred to Guigang and appointed vice-mayor and deputy party chief. In December 2019 he was promoted to become director of the Ethnic and Religious Affairs Committee of Guangxi Autonomous Region, a position he held until September 2020, when he was appointed the Chinese Ambassador to Pakistan, replacing Yao Jing. In 2021 during a visit to the Pakistani city of Quetta, located in the province of Balochistan near the Afghan border, the Ambassador's hotel was subject to a car bomb attack.  The Pakistani Taliban claimed responsibility for the attack.

In February 2023, he was appointed Assistant Minister of Foreign Affairs by the State Council.

References

External links

1967 births
Living people
Peking University alumni
People's Republic of China politicians from Guangxi
Chinese Communist Party politicians from Guangxi
Ambassadors of China to Pakistan
Delegates to the 13th National People's Congress